The 1912 Argentine Primera División was the 21st season of top-flight football in Argentina. Two tournaments were held at the same time, due to the establishment of Federación Argentina de Football (FAF), a dissident association which organised its own championship. Thus, Quilmes won the official AFA tournament, while Porteño won the FAF title.

The AFA season began on April 14 and ended on December 13 while the FAF season began on July 11 and ended on December 23.

Asociación Argentina de Football – Copa Campeonato  

Many former players of Alumni (dissolved one year later) went to play for Quilmes, which would be the champion. The tournament had no relegations. Estudiantes (LP) (promoted) added to the championship.

Federación Argentina de Football 

In July 1912, Gimnasia y Esgrima de Buenos Aires disaffiliated from Asociación Argentina de Football, founding the Federación Argentina de Football (FAF) presided by Ricardo Aldao. Recently promoted teams Porteño and Estudiantes (LP) joined the new league, among other clubs.

1912 was the inaugural season of the dissident FAF league. This tournament was formed by 3 dissident teams from the Asociación Argentina (AAF): Estudiantes de La Plata, Gimnasia y Esgrima (BA) and Porteño, plus the 4 teams promoted from the second division: Argentino de Quilmes, Atlanta, Independiente and Kimberley. The last club added was the recently created Sociedad Sportiva Argentina.

Championship playoff 
Independiente and Porteño finished level on points at the top of the table, necessitating a championship playoff. The game was suspended at 87' after the Independiente players abandoned the pitch in protest at a disallowed goal by referee Carlos Aertz. The championship was then awarded to Porteño.

Match details

Notes

References

Argentine Primera División seasons
p
p
1912 in Argentine football
1912 in South American football